Anhui Foreign Economic Construction Group (AFECC) is a Chinese construction and mining company with an international focus that includes 14 overseas subsidiaries in Asia, Europe, Africa, the Caribbean, and Pacific Islands.  Based on the value of 2011 deals, the company ranks among the top 225 contractors in terms of international projects.

In its charitable giving, the company contributed $1.5 million towards a week long phase of a medical mission called the "Brightness Trip", in which a medical team visiting the hospitals of Malawi treated patients with cataract conditions.

Due to a high debt burden, the company defaulted on RMB 6.7 billion in bonds in June of 2019. Chinese regulators were slow to recognize the risk, rating the company's bonds AA+ a month before the default.

Operations
The company develops diamond mines in the DRC and Zimbabwe.

Costa Rica
The company built the National Stadium of Costa Rica.

Democratic Republic of the Congo
In the DRC, the company entered into a 50-50 joint venture agreement with the government to develop a mine in eastern Kasai that could produce 6 million carats by 2016.  The terms of the agreement were publicly revealed in March 2013 and specified that the company would contribute $4.2 million in equity, provide a signing bonus of $61 million, and invest in various infrastructure projects amounting to $100 million throughout the country.  The planned infrastructure projects include the construction of a 4.6- megawatt hydropower plant near Tshibwe; a new building for the national diamond regulator; and assistance in bringing a loan from the Chinese government to fund a 15-megawatt hydroelectric plant at Tubi Tubidi and a road from the plant to Mbuji-Mayi.

Mozambique
The company built the Estádio do Zimpeto football stadium in Mozambique, as well as a cargo terminal at Maputo International Airport.

Zimbabwe

In Zimbabwe, the company launched a joint venture, Anjin together with Zimbabwe Army's Matt Bronze Enterprises. Ajin began mining in July 2010, and received permission from the Kimberly Process to export in 2011 after stockpiling 3 million carats. In 2016, Robert Mugabe accused Anjin out stealing the country's diamonds and ordered all diamond mining to cease. By 2020, Anjin reportedly returned to the country, but there were no reports of Anjin's diamond production from Zimbabwe's Chamber of Mines.

References

Companies based in Hefei
Diamond mining companies
Construction and civil engineering companies of China